Education in Stamford, Connecticut takes place in both public and private schools and college and university campuses.

Higher education
Stamford, Connecticut has branches of the University of Connecticut,  University of Bridgeport and Sacred Heart University. The University of Connecticut's campus is located in a large modern building in downtown that opened in 1998 after extensive renovations to an abandoned former Bloomingdales department store. The other two are located in small office parks in Springdale. All are commuter campuses.

Stamford public schools

Stamford's public education system is an integrated district with racial balance requirements exceeding those of the state of Connecticut.  State standards require that a school's racial makeup be within 25% of the community's racial makeup.  Stamford's standard is a more strict 10%.  Over the years, schools have become unbalanced. Stamford has three public high schools, Westhill High School, Stamford High School and the Academy of Information Technology and Engineering.

No Child Left Behind Act in Stamford
The state Department of Education usually publishes results of Connecticut Mastery Test scores for districts in July and for individual schools in late August.

2007 results
Districtwide 2007 Connecticut Mastery Test results for Stamford public schools showed improvements in math and writing compared with the 2006 scores, but lagged in reading. The school district uses the data to adjust teaching. The district has been concentrating its efforts in improving math skills and also in bringing up scores for black students. This year's results showed small gains in almost all grades for black students.

The biggest increase in math scores was from sixth grade students. A total of 54 percent of them reached the state goal, compared with 48 percent in 2006. Fifth grade students had the smallest increase, with 63 percent reaching the state goal, up from 60 percent in 2006. Students in Grades 3 and 7 also had higher scores than the previous year.

In writing, scores improved, with third grade students making the most gains — 60 percent met the state goal, up from 54 percent the previous year. Students in the eighth grade scored only 1 percent higher — 55 percent met the state standard.

In reading, third grade students improved, with 49 percent meeting the state goal, up from 46 percent in 2006. Only 48 percent of fourth grade students met the state goal, down from 55 percent in 2006.

2006 results
Thirteen of the city's 20 public schools made the 2006 list of failing schools, based on Connecticut Mastery Test results, according to the state Department of Education's "No Child Left Behind Act" report (NCLB), five more than in 2005. The NCLB Act sets rising targets for schools, so even though some may have improved since the previous testing, they can be cited if improvement isn't made fast enough, Superintendent of Schools Joshua Starr told The Advocate of Stamford (August 24, 2006), which published a list of the local schools provided by Associated Press:

Rippowam Middle School — "whole school deficiencies in math and reading"
K.T. Murphy School — "whole school deficiencies in reading"
Julia A. Stark School — "whole school deficiencies in reading"
Newfield School  — "subgroup deficiencies in math and reading"
Rogers School — "subgroup deficiencies in math and reading"
Roxbury School — "subgroup deficiencies in math and reading"
Springdale School — "subgroup deficiencies in math and reading"
Toquam Magnet School — "subgroup deficiencies in math and reading"
Davenport Ridge School — "subgroup deficiencies in math and reading"
Stillmeadow School — "subgroup deficiencies in math and reading"
Hart School — "subgroup deficiencies in math and reading"
Turn of River School — "subgroup deficiencies in math and reading"
Scofield Middle School — "subgroup deficiencies in math and reading"

In nearby communities, 11 Norwalk schools were cited, one in Greenwich, one in Wilton, none in New Canaan or Darien.

District Reference Group H
Stamford is one of the eight public school systems in District Reference Group H, a classification made by the state Department of Education for the purpose of comparison with the achievement levels of similar schools and districts. District reference groups are defined  as "districts whose students' families are similar in education, income, occupation and need, and that have roughly similar enrollment". The other seven school districts in the group are Ansonia, Danbury, Derby, East Hartford, Meriden, Norwich, Norwalk, and West Haven.

Elementary schools

Westover Elementary School, 412 Stillwater Avenue, dedicated its auditorium on September 16, 2006, to former principal Edmund Barbieri, who became principal in 1979 and continued to head the school for 13 years. He died in 2004. Barbieri built up the magnet program at the school, set up the city's first gifted-students program and the state's first full-day Kindergarten, according to a committee of parents, teachers and city officials who supported the dedication.
Toquam Magnet Elementary School - it focuses on Social Studies as the main study. The former principal, Eileen Swerdlick, was chosen as the Assistant Superintendent of Schools, and left Toquam in July 2004.
Roxbury Elementary School is an elementary school containing approximately 600 students.  It is right across the street from Westhill High School, one of the three high schools in Stamford, Connecticut.  The former principal of Roxbury, Gail Flaster, retired before the 2008–2009 school year.  She was replaced by Gloria Manna.  Ironically, Roxbury Elementary School is located on Westhill Road, while Westhill High School is located on Roxbury Road.

Middle schools

Turn of River Middle School

In early 2007, school officials said they worry that a child might be seriously injured in an accident involving the school's many large glass windows, some of which are floor-to-ceiling and not shatter-resistant. The windows of the building, which was constructed in 1963, are often made of single panes of glass instead of more modern double- or triple-panes that insulate better. A few years before 2007, a student leaning back in his chair accidentally struck a window pane which then shattered.

Rippowam Middle School
Located on High Ridge Road, Rippowam is the district's largest traditional middle school.

George Giberti, principal of the Scofield Magnet Middle School for the 2006–2007 school year, was reassigned as principal at Rippowam for the school year beginning in the fall of 2007. Schools Superintendent Joshua Starr said Giberti has experience in raising math scores and has been in charge of large traditional middle schools in New York City and Long Island. Giberti switched places with Jan Grossman, who took over Giberti's job at Scofield, where she had previously been assistant principal. The transfers were part of a large number under a policy by Starr to give administrators more varied experiences.

Various groups use the Rippowam building on weekends, including The Stamford Youth Foundation's chess league and wrestling program, a youth basketball program in the gym, a Chinese school on Sundays, and, since 2007, the German School of Connecticut.

German School of Connecticut
The German School of Connecticut (GSC) holds classes on Saturday mornings from 9:30 am to 12:15 pm. 
The German School in Stamford (at Rippowam Middle School, 381 High Ridge Road, Stamford, CT, 06905) currently teaches more than 250 students each Saturday in 20 to 22 classrooms. The school also runs classes in West Hartford (At the First Baptist Church, 90 North Main Street, West Hartford, CT 06107). The German School offers German language instruction in a friendly, stimulating learning environment for children age 2 through high school and adults.

In addition to language education, German culture and traditions (both old and new) form an important part of the curriculum, offering students a modern view of German speaking countries.

Rites of Passage
Rites of Passage is an after school program on African American history. It is hosted by the Stamford Public Schools.  Students attend classes for 12 Saturdays and learn about African origins, slavery, and civil rights.  The program culminates in an educational trip to West Africa to see the ancestral home of many African Americans.  The program requires competitive admission and acceptance.

Charter schools

Stamford Academy
Stamford Academy is a charter high school run by Domus Kids Inc. The school accepts students who have failed out of other high schools in the area. The school features small classes, family advocates to help students address social and emotional challenges, uniforms, and credit recovery options.

In the summer of 2007 a student selected by school officials traveled to Benin as a "cultural ambassador" who would help build classrooms and live with villagers as part of the Bridgeport, Connecticut-based Higher Education and Responsibility through Overseas Exchange program.

Trailblazers Academy
Trailblazers Academy, a charter middle school, is run by the nonprofit Domus Kids Inc. of Stamford. Trailblazers students have struggled in traditional schools. Trailblazers features small class sizes, uniforms, after-school activities, and a longer school day. The school holds a weekly ceremony recognizing successes. Family advocates are assigned to students to address each student's social and emotional challenges.

J.M. Wright Technical High School
J.M. Wright Technical High School, located just south of Scalzi Park, is a vocational school run by the State of Connecticut. Facing declining enrollment, the school closed after the 2008–2009 school year. The state plans to reopen the school in fall 2014.

Private education
The city has several private schools, including the Jewish High School of Connecticut, King School, the Long Ridge School, Sacred Heart Academy (closed since 2006), the Mead School, Bi-Cultural Hebrew Academy, and Trinity Catholic High School.

The Long Ridge School
The Long Ridge School is a co-educational independent day school for children two years old through Grade 5. The school was founded by Harriet Rowland in 1938 in her home on Old Long Ridge Road. Mrs. Rowland founded the school based on the premise that children learn in different ways and at different rates and that challenging academics can go hand in hand with a joyful educational experience. The school moved to its 14-acre Erskine Road campus in the mid 1950s. An Arts and Athletics Center, winner of the Connecticut HOBI award for excellence in new construction, was opened in 2007. The Long Ridge School is one of the few schools in Fairfield County focusing specifically on early childhood and elementary education. Headmaster: Kris Bria

The Mead School
The Mead School, founded in 1969, serves children in preschool programs through Grade 8. The school, with an enrollment of 178 in the 2004–2005 academic year, adds programs in drama, music, art and dance to a traditional curriculum. The school also emphasizes community service and skills in negotiation and mediation.

Bi-Cultural Hebrew Academy of Connecticut
The Bi-Cultural Hebrew Academy of Connecticut is a co-educational, nonprofit Modern Orthodox Jewish institution founded in 1955 and serving children in Pre-Kindergarten through Twelfth Grade. Students in 8th Grade spend a month in Israel, while the 6th Graders go to Philadelphia in June, and the 7th Grade goes to Greenkill in October and Washington D.C. in June. The school had an enrollment of 431 students in the 2004–2005 academic year. In 2018, the school, which had previously been a Pre-K through 8th grade school named Bi-Cultural Day School, merged with the Jewish High School of Connecticut and became Bi-Cultural Hebrew Academy of Connecticut. Previously, the school won a National Blue Ribbon Award in 2017.

Administration: As of 2019

Rabbi Tzvi (Harold) Bernstein, Dean, big man on campus
Mrs. Rachel Haron, Principal, Lower School (Pre-to Grade 8)
Rabbi Shimmy Trencher, Principal, Upper School (Grades 9–12)
Mrs. Miriam Sperber, Director of Admissions

The school's curriculum is a complement of secular and Judaic studies, which include, according to the school's Web site, "an understanding of Jewish values, a broad knowledge of Jewish history and religious practice, sensitivity to community needs, a strong bond with Israel and an appreciation of their dual heritage as American Jews". 
Hebrew language, Torah and all aspects of Jewish observance are taught. In the past decade (up to 2007), the school has organized and sent more than 200 marchers a year to the annual Israel Day Parade in New York.

Notes

External links
Stamford Public Schools
The William Pitt Child Development Center
Stamford Adult Education
Stamford page at Great Schools website

Private schools
The King and Low-Heywood Thomas School 
The Bi-Cultural Hebrew Academy 
The Mead School

Catholic schools
Trinity Catholic High School, 926 Newfield Ave., Kevin Burke, president and chief financial officer; Robert D'Aquila, principal
The Catholic Academy of Stamford PreK3-8, 1186 Newfield Ave

Colleges and universities
University of Connecticut, Stamford campus 
Fairfield University
Sacred Heart University has a campus in the Springdale neighborhood of Stamford.
The University of Bridgeport has a campus in the Springdale neighborhood.

 
Stamford Connecticut, Education in
Stamford